Ancylaini is a tribe of apid bees. The name was fixed by an ICZN opinion to differentiate it from the Ancylini tribe of fresh-water molluscs.

References
C. D. Michener (2000) The Bees of the World, Johns Hopkins University Press.

Apinae
Bee tribes